The 2007 IIHF World Championship Division II tournament consisted of two groups of six teams. Group A was held in Zagreb, Croatia from April 11 to 17, 2007, while Group B was held in Seoul, South Korea from April 2 to April 8, 2007. Croatia won Group A and South Korea won Group B, with both teams being promoted to the Division I tournament. Turkey was relegated to Division III, as was North Korea, though the latter did not participate and was automatically relegated as a result.

Group A
The IIHF entered  in the 2007 tournament as the successor to the  national team.

Standings

Croatia promoted to Division I.
Turkey demoted to Division III.

Scoring leaders

Group B

Standings

South Korea promoted to Division I.
North Korea demoted to Division III.

Scoring leaders

IIHF World Championship Division II
3
International ice hockey competitions hosted by Croatia
IIHF World Championship Division II, 2007
April 2007 sports events
April 2007 sports events in Europe
2000s in Zagreb
Sports competitions in Seoul
2000s in Seoul